The Pueblo Hatchery is the only Colorado Parks and Wildlife cold and warm water fish production facility located in Lake Pueblo State Park near Arkansas River in Pueblo County.

History
Pueblo Hatchery was built by the Federal Bureau of Reclamation, but Colorado Parks and Wildlife is responsible for maintenance and operation.

Fish Species
Hatchery staff works to support the raising of fry, fingerlings, and catchables of rainbow trout. The hatchery raises crappie, bluegills, largemouth bass, brown trout, saugeye, wiper and walleye. Their source of water comes from surface water.

References 

Fish hatcheries in the United States
Buildings and structures in Pueblo County, Colorado
Tourist attractions in Colorado